Gaussian algorithm may refer to:

 Gaussian elimination for solving systems of linear equations
 Gauss's algorithm for Determination of the day of the week
 Gauss's method for preliminary orbit determination
 Gauss's Easter algorithm
 Gauss separation algorithm